"4, 5, 6" is the first single released from Solé's debut album, Skin Deep. It was produced by Christopher "Tricky" Stewart and featured a guest verse from JT Money and a chorus by Kandi. This was Solé's second collaboration with JT Money and Stewart, as the three had worked together on JT Money's hit single "Who Dat" the previous year

The song was a success, peaking at number 21 on the Billboard Hot 100 while also topping the Billboard Hot Rap Singles chart. "4, 5, 6" was certified gold by the Recording Industry Association of America (RIAA) for selling over 517,000 copies in the year of 2000. It was one of the most successful rap songs of the year 2000, reaching number 2 on the Billboard Year-End Hot Rap Singles, only behind Missy Elliott's "Hot Boyz".

Single track listing

A-Side
"4, 5, 6" (Radio Edit) - 3:17  
"4,5,6" (Clean Album Edit) - 4:19

B-Side
"Da Story" (Clean Version) - 3:47

Charts

Weekly charts

Year-end charts

References

1999 songs
1999 debut singles
Solé songs
Kandi Burruss songs
Song recordings produced by Tricky Stewart
DreamWorks Records singles